Rishton Ka Manjha is an Indian Hindi-language television drama series that premiered on 23 August 2021 on Zee TV and digital platform, ZEE5. Produced by Tent Cinema, it stars Aanchal Goswami and Krushal Ahuja in the lead-roles. It is a remake of Zee Bangla's Deep Jwele Jai. This show marks Krushal Ahuja's debut in the Hindi-Television industry. It ended on April 2, 2022 and was replaced by Mithai  in its timeslot.

Premise
The story of the show revolves around Diya and Arjun, two youths from the city of Kolkata. Diya is the happy girl who sets her dreams on making it big in badminton. However, she faces all kinds of opposition, and the broad story is about how she meets Arjun who goes on to become a strong support for her in her life journey.

Cast

Main Cast
 Aanchal Goswami as Diya Arjun Agrawal (née Mukherjee): Mohan and Meera's daughter; Bablu's sister; Arjun's Wife; Ajit's ex-fiancée
 Krushal Ahuja as Arjun Amitabh Agrawal: Amitabh and Madhuri's youngest son; Diya's Husband; Luv and Kush's younger brother; Tina's ex-fiancé

Recurring
 Nandini Chatterjee as Madhuri Amitabh Agrawal: Amitabh's wife; Luv, Kush and Arjun's mother
Bharat Kaul as Amitabh Agrawal: Madhuri's husband; Luv, Kush and Arjun's father
Priyanka Nayan as Deepika Luv Agrawal: Luv's wife
Manav Sachdev as Luv Amitabh Agrawal: Madhuri and Amitabh's eldest son; Arjun and Kush's elder brother; Deepika's husband
Farhina Parvez as Niharika Kush Agrawal: Kush's wife
Uday Pratap Singh Rajput as Kush Amitabh Agarwal: Madhuri and Amitabh's second son; Arjun's elder brother; Luv's younger brother; Niharika's husband
Madhvi Singh as Dadi: Amitabh's mother; Luv, Kush and Arjun's grandmother
 Mishmee Das as Tina Singhal: Sanjeev's daughter; Arjun's ex-fiancée
Abhishek Singh as Karan Mathur: Arjun and Diya's rival 
Tapasya Dasgupta as Meera Mukherjee: Mohan's wife; Diya and Bablu's mother
Kavita Banerjee as Kavita Mathur: Karan's sister and Arjun and Diya's rival

Production

Development
Krushal Ahuja was cast as the main lead even before the show received a title.

Shooting
The shoot began in June in Kolkata and later halted due to the coronavirus disease.

Release
The first promo was launched for the show along with the promo of another show, Meet on 30 July 2021.

Adaptations

References

2021 Indian television series debuts
Hindi-language television shows
Indian drama television series
Indian television soap operas
Television shows set in Kolkata
Zee TV original programming